Clarksburg is a village in Ross County, Ohio, United States. The population was 409 at the 2020 census.

History
The first permanent settlement at Clarksburg was made c. 1800. Clarksburg was platted in 1817 by George Clark, and named for him.

Gallery

Geography
Clarksburg is located at  (39.506388, -83.154524).

Demographics

2010 census
As of the census of 2010, there were 455 people, 166 households, and 117 families living in the village. The racial makeup of the village was 98.5% White, 0.2% African American, 0.4% from other races, and 0.9% from two or more races. Hispanic or Latino of any race were 1.8% of the population.

There were 166 households, of which 38.6% had children under the age of 18 living with them, 52.4% were married couples living together, 15.1% had a female householder with no husband present, 3.0% had a male householder with no wife present, and 29.5% were non-families. 22.9% of all households were made up of individuals, and 12% had someone living alone who was 65 years of age or older. The average household size was 2.74 and the average family size was 3.23.

The median age in the village was 34.8 years. 29% of residents were under the age of 18; 8% were between the ages of 18 and 24; 25.8% were from 25 to 44; 23% were from 45 to 64; and 14.3% were 65 years of age or older. The gender makeup of the village was 47.3% male and 52.7% female.

2000 census
As of the census of 2000, there were 516 people, 178 households, and 131 families living in the village. The population density was 2,772.9 people per square mile (1,048.6/km2). There were 190 housing units at an average density of 1,021.0 per square mile (386.1/km2). The racial makeup of the village was 97.48% White, 1.55% African American, 0.19% Native American, 0.58% from other races, and 0.19% from two or more races.

There were 178 households, out of which 37.1% had children under the age of 18 living with them, 53.4% were married couples living together, 15.7% had a female householder with no husband present, and 26.4% were non-families. 20.8% of all households were made up of individuals, and 9.6% had someone living alone who was 65 years of age or older. The average household size was 2.80 and the average family size was 3.20.

In the village, the population was spread out, with 28.5% under the age of 18, 9.7% from 18 to 24, 28.1% from 25 to 44, 22.7% from 45 to 64, and 11.0% who were 65 years of age or older. The median age was 32 years. For every 100 females there were 100.8 males. For every 100 females age 18 and over, there were 95.2 males.

The median income for a household in the village was $32,159, and the median income for a family was $36,667. Males had a median income of $30,781 versus $17,500 for females. The per capita income for the village was $12,064. About 14.6% of families and 18.8% of the population were below the poverty line, including 26.4% of those under age 18 and 18.8% of those age 65 or over.

References

Villages in Ross County, Ohio
Villages in Ohio
1800 establishments in the Northwest Territory
Populated places established in 1800